Ngee Ann Polytechnic (NP) is a post-secondary education institution and statutory board under the purview of the Ministry of Education in Singapore. 

Established in 1963 by the Ngee Ann Kongsi, NP is renowned for its business programmes and central focus on entrepreneurship education. It is also the only polytechnic in Singapore to be affiliated with a foundation.

NP is famous for producing successful entreprenuers due to their strong eco system in supporting start ups. NP's alumni includes founder and former CEO of Creative Technology Sim Wong Hoo, co-founder and CEO of Carousell Quek Siu Rui, co-founder and President of Carousell Marcus Tan, co-founder and CEO of Secretlab Ian Ang, 18th Golden Horse Award for Best Leading Actor Alan Tam, and 50th Golden Horse Award for Best Narrative Feature and Best Original Screenplay Anthony Chen.

History
Founded in 1963 as the Ngee Ann College by the Ngee Ann Kongsi, Ngee Ann Polytechnic started with 116 students, offering courses in language, commerce, and technology.

Academic

Academic schools

There are a total of nine academic schools providing 39 full-time courses.

The polytechnic also offers part-time programmes for adult learners through the CET Academy. Established in 1985, the CET Academy now trains more than 10,000 adults and conducts over 200 courses every year.

Programmes and scholarships
The NP Youth Academy setup by the polytechnic offers programmes for every student anchored in the areas of leadership, character building, and personal development.
The Christieara Programme is a talent development programme for high performing students through initiatives such as Overseas Merit Fellowships and Service Learning trips.
The polytechnic awards more than 1,000 scholarships every year, and over 6,000 students benefit from financial grants amounting to about $15 million a year.

Recognition
The polytechnic was conferred the Singapore Quality Class Star Award for demonstrating business excellence. The polytechnic was also awarded the President's Award for the Environment in 2014.

Notable alumni

Academia
 Richard Yeo, American scientist, and founder of SuperUSA Nutrition Inc & Multi Sensing Inc
 Natasha Sng, Assistant Research Scientist at the University of Florida
 Leow Yi Ning, PhD candidate at the Massachusetts Institute of Technology

Business
 Sim Wong Hoo, founder and former CEO of Creative Technology
 Quek Siu Rui, co-founder and CEO of Carousell
 Marcus Tan, co-founder and President of Carousell
 Ian Ang, co-founder and CEO of Secretlab
 Aaron Tan, co-founder and CEO of Carro
 Clara Lee, Vice President of Brand at Neste

Entertainment
 Alan Tam, 18th Golden Horse Award for Best Leading Actor
 Anthony Chen, 50th Golden Horse Award for Best Feature Film, Best New Director, and Best Original Screenplay
 Alaric Tay, Mediacorp actor 
 Andie Chen, Mediacorp actor 
 Nick Teo, Mediacorp actor
 Richie Koh, Mediacorp actor 
 Shane Pow, former Mediacorp actor
 Derrick Hoh, singer
 Vanessa Fernandez, singer
 Boo Junfeng, film producer  
 Tzang Merwyn Tong, film producer
 Cruz Teng, television presenter
 Hazlina Abdul Halim, television presenter
 Dennis Chew, radio DJ and actor
 Gerald Koh, radio DJ
 Jean Danker, radio DJ
 Joshua Simon, radio DJ
 Vernetta Lopez, actress and radio DJ
 Maddy Barber, radio DJ 
 Jamie Yeo, actress and model

Politics
 Mohd Fahmi, Mayor of South East District (2020–present) and Member of Parliament for Marine Parade GRC (2020–present)
 Don Wee, Member of Parliament for Chua Chu Kang GRC (2020–present)
 Lee Li Lian, Member of Parliament for Punggol East SMC (2013–2015)

References

External links
Official website
 Webometrics Ranking of World Universities

Polytechnics in Singapore
Statutory boards of the Singapore Government
1963 establishments in Singapore
Educational institutions established in 1963
Education in Singapore